The 205th Engineer Battalion is an engineer battalion of the Louisiana Army National Guard. It is part of one of the 225th Engineer Brigade, one of largest engineer brigades in the United States Army National Guard. The 205th Engineer Battalion is headquartered in Bogalusa, LA in Washington Parish with the remaining companies and detachments located in St. Tammany, Tangipahoa, Ascension, and Jefferson parishes. The battalion provides command and control to plan integrate, and direct execution of three to five assigned engineer companies and one Forward Support Company (FSC) to provide mobility in support application or focused logistics.

Lineage and honors
Origin
 Organized 22 January 1913 in the Louisiana National Guard as Company G, 1st Infantry Regiment at Bogalusa
 Mustered into Federal Service 25 June 1916 at Camp Stafford, Louisiana, for service on the Mexican Border
 Mustered out of Federal service 25 September 1916
 Drafted into Federal service 5 August 1917 as an element of the 39th Division
 Redesignated 27 September 1917 as Company G, 156th Infantry
 Expanded 29 October 1917 to form Companies F, G, H, 154th Infantry
 Demobilized 23 January 1919 at Camp Beauregard, Louisiana
 Reorganized 27 November 1920 as Troop A, Cavalry at Bogalusa
 Redesignated 10 August 1922 as Troop E, 2nd Squadron, 108th Cavalry
 Expanded and reorganized 29 June 1927 as the 2nd Squadron, 108th Cavalry
 Consolidated 6 October 1940 with Headquarters and Headquarters Troop and the 3rd Squadron, 108th Cavalry, converted as redesignated as the 105th Separate Battalion Coast Artillery (Antiaircraft)
 Inducted into Federal Service 6 January 1941 at New Orleans
 Redesignated 10 July 1942 as the 105th Coast Artillery Battalion (Antiaircraft Artillery) (Automatic Weapons)
 Redesignated 1 July 1944 as the 105th Antiaircraft Artillery Automatic Weapons Battalion
 Inactivated 15 September 1945 in Italy

Post-war
 Battalion broken up and reorganized in the Louisiana Army National Guard as follows:
 Former elements outside New Orleans reorganized and Federally recognized 11 April 1947 as the 105th Antiaircraft Artillery Automatic Weapons Battalion, and element of the 39th Infantry Division, with the headquarters at Bogalusa
 Headquarters and Headquarters Battery, reorganized and Federally recognized 26 April 1949 as headquarters and Headquarters Battery, 204th Antiaircraft Artillery Group at New Orleans - hereafter separate lineage
 Remaining former elements on New Orleans reorganized and Federally recognized 23 May 1949 as the 527th Antiaircraft Artillery Gun Battalion - hereafter separate lineage
 105th antiaircraft Artillery Weapons Battalion reorganized and redesignated 1 October 1953 as the 105th antiaircraft Artillery Battalion
 Converted, reorganized, and redesignated 1 July 1959 as the 139th Armor, a parent regiment under the Combat Army Regimental System, to consist of the 1st Reconnaissance Squadron, an element of the 39th Infantry Division
 Reorganized and redesignated 1 May 1963 as the 139th Cavalry to consist of the 1st Squadron
 Converted, reorganized, and designated 1 December 1967 as the 205th Engineer Battalion; concurrently, relieved from assignment to the 39th Infantry Division

Organization
The 205th Engineer Battalion consists of a Headquarters and Headquarters Company, Forward Support Company and four Engineer companies.
The following is the current units of the 205th Engineer Battalion, Combat Heavy and their locations:
 Headquarters and Headquarters Company (HHC) (-Detachment 1) - Bogalusa, Louisiana
 Forward Support Company (FSC) - Hammond, Louisiana 
 1021st Engineer Company (Vertical) (-Detachment 1) - Covington, Louisiana 
 1021st Engineer Company Detachment 1 - Independence, Louisiana 
Detachment 2 1021st Engineer Company - Gonzales, Louisiana 
 843rd Engineer Company (Horizontal) (-Detachment 1) - Franklinton, Louisiana 
 843rd Engineer Company Detachment 1 - Covington, Louisiana 
 2225th Mutli Role Bridge Company (2225th MRBC) - Marrero, Louisiana (Camp Villere)
 2225th Multi Role Bridge Company Detachment 1 - Slidell, Louisiana 
 922nd Engineer Company (Horizontal) - Gonzales, Louisiana 
 922nd Engineer Company Detachment 1 - Baton Rouge, Louisiana

Mission of the Unit
HHC

Provides command and control to plan, integrate, and direct execution of three to five assigned engineer companies and one forward support company (FSC) to provide mobility in support application or focused logistics

FSC

To provide direct and habitual combat sustainment support to the engineer battalion in the engineer brigade

922nd

To plan, conduct, prepare, and provide construction support equipment and personnel for concrete mixing/pouring as part of major horizontal and vertical construction projects such as highways, storage facilities, airfields and base camp construction

843rd

To plan conduct, prepare and provide construction support equipment and personnel for bituminous mixing, paving and major horizontal construction projects such as highways, storage facilities and airfields

2225th

To provide command and control of Multi Role Bridge Company that are necessary to conduct missions such as temporary bridge emplacements, fortification of existing bridges and engineer support for water crossings.

1021st

To provide command and control of three to five vertical engineer platoons that provide specific engineering support to logic region (LR) 1–4. Construct base camps and internment facilities as well as construct, repair, maintain other vertical infrastructures in support of the corps or division and maneuver brigade combat team (BCT)

References

External links
 Louisiana National Guard official homepage
 225th Engineer Brigade

Military units and formations in Louisiana
Engineer battalions of the United States Army
Battalions of the United States Army National Guard